Union sportive de la médina d'Alger (Swimming) (Arabic: الإتحاد الرياضي لمدينة الجزائر للسباحة), referred to as USM Alger SN for a short, is a swimming club based in Algiers, Algeria that played in the Algerian Swimming Championship is the best club in algeria the male category, and especially females.

History
USM Alger Swimming Team was founded in 1978 and is considered one of the strongest clubs in Algeria with GS Pétroliers, especially in the girls category, where it often controls its championships in all categories. On June 20, 2020, while training swimmer Manal Haboub died of a heart attack at the age of 17, while she was preparing to pass the baccalaureate exams. 48 hours after the death in the middle of training in the pool of the Mohamed Boudiaf complex, the swimming federation imposed a medical certificate of good health for any athlete who goes to training. An administrative measure which releases all responsibility of the clubs and the federation for any incident or drama which occurs in the basin. If an athlete does not present the famous document, he will not be able to take part in the training.

Honours
 Algerian Swimming Championship
Algerian OPEN Swimming Champion 2013–14, 2015–16, 2021
Algerian JUNIOR Swimming Champion 2013–14
Champion of Algeria by Points Minimes 2016–17 Girls and boys in Setif
Champion of Algeria Benjamins 2016–17 Girls and boys
Algerian Swimming interclubs Champion 2017.
 Algerian JUNIOR Swimming runners–up Girls and boys 2020.
 Boys 5 gold, 7 silver and 6 bronze
 Girls 6 gold and 2 silver

Notable Swimmers
 Oussama Sahnoune
 Mohamed Ryad Bouhamidi
 Ramzi Chouchar
 Lounis Khendriche
 Jugurtha Boumali
 Nazim Belkhodja
 Moncef Aymen Balamane

References

External links
USMA Natation Facebook officiel page

Swimming
Sport in Algiers
Swimming clubs in Algeria